The 2004 USL Pro Soccer League was the tenth season of the United Soccer Leagues operated competition. The league was sanctioned as Division III by the United States Soccer Federation.

Divisions

Atlantic Division

Northern Division

Southern Division

Western Division

Playoffs

Atlantic Division Finals 

Pittsburgh wins series 7-1 on aggregate

Southern Division Finals 

Charlotte wins series 5-4 on aggregate

Western Division Final

Semi-finals

Championship

References 

3
2004